Gnorimoschema epithymella is a moth in the family Gelechiidae. It was described by Staudinger in 1859. It is found in Spain, France, Austria, Switzerland, Italy, Sardinia, Norway, Sweden, Finland, Estonia, Latvia, Belarus and Russia. Outside of Europe, it has been recorded from North Africa (Algeria) and Kyrgyzstan.

The wingspan is 12–13 mm.

The larvae feed on Solidago virgaurea and Aster alpinus. They mine the leaves of their host plant. The mine probably has the form of a full depth blotch with little or no frass. In Solidago, the larvae also bore the basal part of the stem and the petioles.

Subspecies
Gnorimoschema epithymella epithymella
Gnorimoschema epithymella brunneomaculella (Hackman, 1946) (Fennoscandia)
Gnorimoschema epithymella boerneri (Amsel, 1952) (Sardinia)

References

Gnorimoschema
Moths described in 1859